Lochen is a municipality in the district of Braunau am Inn in the Austrian state of Upper Austria.

Geography
Lochen liest on the Mattsee on a high plateau at the foot of the Tannberg.

References

Cities and towns in Braunau am Inn District